

See also
List of hill forts in Scotland
List of hill forts in Wales
Iron Age, British Iron Age, prehistory

References

Bibliography

Further reading

External links
 A crowd-sourced project to map the hillforts of Britain and Ireland.

 List of hill forts
Iron Age sites in England
 
Hill forts
England
Hill forts